The 29er is a two-person high performance sailing skiff designed by Julian Bethwaite and first produced in 1998. Derived from the Olympic class 49er class, it is raced in the ISAF Youth Sailing World Championships. The 29er is able to reach high speeds fairly quickly by having a sleek and hydrodynamic hull and will often exceed the wind speed when planing both up and downwind.

Background

The 29er class is targeted at youth, especially those training to sail the larger Olympic 49er.   The Youth Sailing World Championships has adopted it to replace the Laser 2 - which was designed by Julian Bethwaite's father Frank.

The 29er has two sailors, one on trapeze. The rig features a fractional asymmetrical spinnaker; a self-tacking jib decreases the work load of the crew, making maneuvers  more efficient and freeing the crew to take the mainsheet upwind and on two-sail reaches. The spinnaker rigging set-up challenges crews to be fit and coordinated, and maneuvers in the boat require athleticism due to its lack of inherent stability and the high speed with which the fully battened mainsail and jib power up. 

The hull construction is of fibreglass-reinforced polyester in a foam sandwich layout. The fully battened mainsail and jib are made from a transparent Mylar laminate with orange or red Dacron trimming, while the spinnaker is manufactured from ripstop Nylon. The mast is in three parts - an aluminium bottom and middle section, with a polyester-fiberglass composite tip to increase mast bend and decrease both overall weight, and the capsizing moment a heavy mast tip can generate. Foils are aluminium or fibreglass. 

The class has shown large popularity in Oceania with over 700 registered boats out of the 7000 registered worldwide

Events

World Championship

Youth Sailing World Championships

The 29er has been used as equipment in the ISAF Youth Sailing World Championships.

Open

Boys

Girls

29er XX and XS

Bethwaite and Jen Glass have also designed the 29erXX, a twin trapeze derivative of the 29er. It uses the same hull with some minor changes such as an extended gunwale and a rudder gantry, with a larger rig that includes a square-top main and masthead asymmetric spinnaker. The class became an International Sailing Federation recognised class in its own right in 2010. 

In late 2012 Bethwaite announced another new version, the 29erXS, aimed at younger and/or lighter sailors. The XS features a similar rig to the XX, but of smaller size fitted to a standard 29er hull and employing a single trapeze.  The main being 4.29sqm and the jib 2.13sqm, the spinnaker is similarly downsized. The intention is that sailors can upgrade the rig when they are ready to move to full sized sails, and keep the hull, which will remain standard across all 29er variants.

References

External links

International Links
29er.org
 ISAF 29er Microsite

Builders
Ovington Boats
Bethwaite Design

National Class Associations
29er Class Association of New Zealand 
German 29er Association
British 29er Association
North American Class Page
Danish 29er Association
Swiss 29er Association
 29er Class Organisation
Swedish 9er Association
Polish 9er Association 

 
Classes of World Sailing
Dinghies
Two-person sailboats
1990s sailboat type designs
Sailboat type designs by Julian Bethwaite